Stadio Gino Pistoni is a multi-use stadium in Ivrea, Italy.  It is currently used mostly for football matches and is the home ground of A.S.D. Calcio Ivrea.  The stadium holds 3,500 people.

References 
https://int.soccerway.com/venues/italy/stadio-comunale-gino-pistoni/ (In Italian)

Gina Pistoni
A.S.D. Calcio Ivrea
Buildings and structures in Ivrea